Colin Tyler Anderson (born November 21, 1989) is an American football tight end who is currently a free agent. He was signed by the Minnesota Vikings as an undrafted free agent in 2013. He played college football at Furman.

Professional career

2013 NFL Pro Day

Minnesota Vikings 
On April 30, 2013, Anderson signed with the Minnesota Vikings as an undrafted free agent following the conclusion of the 2013 NFL Draft. On August 31, 2013, he was released before the start of the regular season.

New York Jets 

On December 31, 2013, Anderson signed a future/reserve contract with the New York Jets.  He was released on August 24, 2014.

References

External links
 New York Jets bio

1989 births
Living people
American football tight ends
Furman Paladins football players
New York Jets players
People from Gaithersburg, Maryland
Players of American football from Maryland
Sportspeople from Montgomery County, Maryland